Hilary Gehman (born August 15, 1971 in Shirley, Massachusetts) is an American rower. She competed in women's quadruple sculls at the 2000 Summer Olympics and the 2004 Summer Olympics.

References 
 
 

Colby College alumni
1971 births
Living people
Sportspeople from Middlesex County, Massachusetts
Olympic rowers of the United States
Rowers at the 2000 Summer Olympics
Rowers at the 2004 Summer Olympics
People from Shirley, Massachusetts
World Rowing Championships medalists for the United States
American female rowers
21st-century American women